Northbrook College is a further education and higher education college with three campuses: Broadwater Campus and West Durrington Campus in Worthing and Shoreham Airport Campus in Shoreham-by-Sea. It was founded as West Sussex College of Art & Design in 1912 and became Northbrook College Sussex in 1986. In 2017 Northbrook merged with City College Brighton & Hove to create a unified college under the name Greater Brighton Metropolitan College (MET). Northbrook College is now part of the Chichester College Group after Greater Brighton Metropolitan College merged with CCG on 1 August 2022. 

Northbrook was previously West Sussex College of Design (WSCD) but amalgamated with Worthing Technical College and Chelsea College of Aeronautical and Automobile Engineering in 1985–86. Whilst the college retained its central Worthing site in Union Place, West Sussex County Council (WSCC) closed the workshops in Homefield Place, which were knocked down and are now the Environment Agency headquarters for the area.

The college is the largest provider of higher education for the creative and cultural industries in West Sussex. It is also a significant provider of higher education in a variety of other work-related areas. The College, additionally, has contracts for apprenticeship training and adult and community learning, and provides courses in most work-related areas as well as those for personal development.

The college is also home to the Southern Theatre Arts Centre, providing theatre courses ranging from National Diplomas to Foundation Degrees and BA Hons, which like all Northbrook's higher education courses are affiliated with the University of Brighton. Its venue, The Northbrook Theatre, is a professional theatre that regularly hosts touring companies from around the UK and Europe. Productions in recent years include Wild Party, Chess, The Blue Room, Angels in America, Metamorphosis and West.

Notable alumni

 Jamie Hewlett, comic book artist and co-creator of the comic Tank Girl and co-creator of the virtual band Gorillaz
 Alan Martin, comic book writer and co-creator of the comic Tank Girl
 Luke Newton, actor
 Paul Norris, Oscar winner in Visual Effects for the film Ex Machina.
 Claire Phillips, British portrait artist
 Leo Sayer, singer-songwriter and musician
 Robert Smith, front man and principal songwriter to the band The Cure
 Hilary Stratton, Sculptor and teacher (West Sussex College of Art & Design)
 Sunset Strippers, electronic music band
 Nick Waplington, artist and photographer

References

External links
 

Buildings and structures in Worthing
Defunct universities and colleges in England
1986 establishments in England
Educational institutions established in 1986
2017 disestablishments in England
Educational institutions disestablished in 2017